The 1995–96 UEFA Champions League featured 24 teams, with eight teams (the league champions from the seven top-ranked nations in the UEFA country coefficient table, plus the defending champions from 1994–95) qualifying automatically for the group stage and the remaining 16 (the league champions of the nations ranked 8–23 in the country coefficient table) playing in a two-legged preliminary round. The winners of each tie entered the Champions League group stage

Dynamo Kyiv won their tie against Aalborg BK, but, in their first group game against Panathinaikos, they were accused of a failed attempt to bribe referee Antonio López Nieto to get a win. Despite an appeal, they were thrown out of the competition by UEFA and were banned for the subsequent two years. Aalborg BK replaced them in the group stage. Dynamo's ban was eventually reduced to just one season.

Summary

|}

Matches

First leg

Second leg

References

External links
Qualifying round at UEFA.com

qualifying round
1995-96